Arctostaphylos bakeri is a species of manzanita known by the common name Baker's manzanita. It is endemic to Sonoma County, California, where it grows in the chaparral and woodlands of the North Coast Ranges. It is sometimes a member of the serpentine soils flora.

Description
Arctostaphylos bakeri is a shrub growing one to three meters in height. Its smaller twigs are bristly and glandular or hairy to woolly. The dark green leaves are generally oval in shape and up to 3 centimeters long. They may be glandular, rough or fuzzy in texture, and dull or shiny in appearance.

The plentiful inflorescences hold crowded clusters of urn-shaped manzanita flowers. The fruit is a hairless drupe up to a centimeter wide.

See also
California chaparral and woodlands
Milo Samuel Baker

References

External links
Jepson Manual Treatment — Arctostaphylos bakeri
USDA Plants Profile: Arctostaphylos bakeri
Arctostaphylos bakeri — Photo gallery

bakeri
Endemic flora of California
Natural history of the California chaparral and woodlands
Natural history of the California Coast Ranges
Natural history of Sonoma County, California
Plants described in 1934
Endemic flora of the San Francisco Bay Area
Taxa named by Alice Eastwood